Samantha Bentley (born 8 October 1987) is an English former pornographic actress, musician and writer.

Early life
Bentley was born and raised in South London, England. She stripped while attending university, where she studied design, before working in pornography.

Career
Bentley started glamour modelling when she was around 18 or 19 years old and has appeared in Page 3 of The Sun. She decided to enter the adult film industry after an ex-boyfriend told her it would be "cool" if she were a porn star. She began by filming her own amateur videos, which are no longer in her possession. When she was 20 years old, she performed solo for a British tease website which posted her work under the name Samantha B, Samantha being her real first name. She initially wanted to use the stage name Pixie May, but a friend of hers suggested she use a name similar to the one from the tease site in order to make it easier for fans to find her. She initially worked for two years in girl/girl scenes only. She did her first scene, which was for 21Sextury, at the age of 22 in Budapest with a Czech female performer. Her first boy/girl scene was with Ian Tate for Harmony Films. This was also her first anal sex scene. She was the Penthouse Pet of the Month for August 2015.

Mainstream media appearances
Bentley played a prostitute in the fourth season of the HBO series Game of Thrones, appearing in a bath scene opposite Davos Seaworth, who is played by Liam Cunningham. In April 2015, it was announced that Bentley will also appear in the show's fifth season. She has also appeared in a music video for Wiz Khalifa and in a mainstream film titled Look of Love. On 19 August 2014, Cosmopolitan UK published an article titled "14 weird questions about life as a porn star, answered by professionals", in which Bentley is featured. On 7 February 2016, she penned a blog for The Huffington Post titled "Women Against Feminism – A Pornstar's Point of View", in which she criticised feminists who slut-shame porn actresses, and is now a writer for Jerrick Media talking about sex, porn, geek culture, yoga and health.

Other ventures
On 16 April 2015, Bentley made her DJing debut at Total Uprawr in the London Borough of Camden. She also plays classical piano. She joined a PETA campaign in protest against the Russian Space Agency's plan to send four macaque monkeys to Mars in 2017, in which she was laid in a pool of fake blood while wearing body paint that depicted her as a monkey in a space helmet outside of the Embassy of Russia in London on 13 January 2016.

Awards and nominations

See also
 List of British pornographic actors

References

External links

 
 
 
 
 

1987 births
British erotic dancers
Club DJs
English women DJs
English female adult models
English pornographic film actresses
Female critics of feminism
Women DJs
Living people
Page 3 girls
Penthouse Pets
People from London
HuffPost writers and columnists
Electronic dance music DJs
21st-century women musicians
British women columnists
Actresses from London